Saleh Al-Buraiki  is a Kuwaiti football midfielder who played for Kuwait in the 2000 Summer Olympics. He also played for Al-Salmiya.

External links
 

1977 births
Living people
Kuwaiti footballers
Kuwait international footballers
Footballers at the 2000 Summer Olympics
Al Salmiya SC players
Olympic footballers of Kuwait
Place of birth missing (living people)
Asian Games medalists in football
Footballers at the 1998 Asian Games
Footballers at the 2002 Asian Games
Asian Games silver medalists for Kuwait
Association football midfielders
Medalists at the 1998 Asian Games
Al-Yarmouk SC (Kuwait) players
Kuwait Premier League players